Iacopino is an Italian surname. Notable people with the surname include:

Vincent Iacopino, American doctor and author
Vincenzo Iacopino (born 1976), Italian footballer

Italian-language surnames